Eric Jonassen (born August 16, 1968) is a former American football tackle. He played for the San Diego Chargers from 1993 to 1994.

References

1968 births
Living people
American football tackles
Penn State Nittany Lions football players
Bloomsburg Huskies football players
San Diego Chargers players